Kim Woo-jin (Hangul: 김우진;  or  ; born June 20, 1992) is a South Korean archer specializing in recurve archery. He first held the world number one ranking ranking in 2011. At the 2016 Summer Olympics, he set a world record in men's individual recurve archery and received a gold medal as a member of the South Korean men's archery team. He is a three-time world champion in the men's individual recurve event at the World Archery Championships.

At the 2016 Summer Olympics, he won an Olympic gold medal as a member of the South Korean men's archery team, which defeated the United States in the men's team archery final. He is a student, and lives in Chungju.

Career
Kim was part of the 2011 World Archery Championships gold medal winning men's team, and won the individual gold medal at the 2011 World Archery Championships and the 2012 FITA Archery World Cup. Despite this, he was not selected for the 2012 Korean Olympic team.

In 2015, Kim was again selected for the Korean national team, and became the first man since 1985 to win the World Archery Championships twice.

During the 2016 Summer Olympics, Kim set a world record during the individual men's qualifying round with a score of 700 out of a possible 720 (held under World Archery Federation rules at a distance of 70 meters). The previous record of 699 was set by Im Dong-hyun (also of South Korea) at the 2012 Olympics, and the record would stand until surpassed by Brady Ellison with a score of 702 at the 2019 World Archery Championships. However, in a major upset, Kim lost 2–6 in the second round in the individual category to Indonesia's Riau Ega Agatha. He was one of the three members of the South Korean men's team who won the Olympic gold medal in the team competition.

Personal life 
As of August 2021, Kim was planning to marry his non-celebrity girlfriend in December 2021.

See also
 List of South Korean archers

References

External links 
 
 

1992 births
Living people
South Korean male archers
Asian Games medalists in archery
Archers at the 2010 Asian Games
Archers at the 2014 Asian Games
Archers at the 2018 Asian Games
World Archery Championships medalists
Asian Games gold medalists for South Korea
Asian Games silver medalists for South Korea
Olympic archers of South Korea
Archers at the 2016 Summer Olympics
Medalists at the 2016 Summer Olympics
Medalists at the 2020 Summer Olympics
Olympic gold medalists for South Korea
Olympic medalists in archery
Sportspeople from North Chungcheong Province
Medalists at the 2010 Asian Games
Medalists at the 2018 Asian Games
Universiade medalists in archery
Universiade silver medalists for South Korea
South Korean Buddhists
Medalists at the 2015 Summer Universiade
Medalists at the 2017 Summer Universiade
Archers at the 2020 Summer Olympics
20th-century South Korean people
21st-century South Korean people